Ion Cojar (January 9, 1931 – October 18, 2009) was a Romanian acting teacher, researcher, and theatre director. He is the founder of a unique method that revolutionised the Romanian school of acting.

Ion Cojar as acting teacher
Cojar was born in Recaș, a town in Timiș County. He changed the old way of understanding acting in Romania, when the actor was taught how to play theatre, to act, to fake, imitate or mimic life, emotions or characters, with a new one that demands actors, directors and teachers to create the circumstances in which the truth of life can occur, and the actor to go onstage or during filming through authentic psychologically-realistic processes that cannot be anticipated or consciously controlled, at the end of which they would be actually changed as a person, so that the audiences may be able to follow the lifelike processes, to understand and believe what they see and hear, to empathise with the actors.

Ion Cojar argued that in order to have an authentic performance, the actor's psycho-emotional processes, along with their speech, body movements and physiological changes, which are the results of those processes, must not be anticipated, because this way they would be anchored in preconceived ideas and would not be new and authentic, and also must not be consciously controlled, because we cannot observe our own processes as they are taking place without interrupting them.

In everyday life we never know what is going to happen or how we are going to behave or what we are going to say when we interact with someone. We just try to change something in that person in order to achieve our goal. In the same way, the actor, in a certain life situation and with a certain psychology that were previously assumed, aims to actually change something in their partner in order to achieve their goal (their character's goal that they previously assumed), without anticipating any obstacles, by venturing into the unknown and allowing themself the freedom to make mistakes. This way, everything that will happen to them in the process, from emotions to body movements to speech, will come organically, without being consciously controlled or anticipated, and this way they will be authentic, just like in everyday life, and thus the audiences will understand and believe what they'll see and hear and will empathize with the actor.

Ion Cojar also argued that we can know for sure that the actor is not faking or acting, but is going through an authentic process when we see instant, organic changes in the color and texture of their face, like when blood instantly floods its vessels in important moments, because these changes are almost impossible to fake.

As a professor and researcher at the Caragiale National University of Theatre and Film from Bucharest, guided by the principle "follow the process, not the success", Ion Cojar worked with his students in order for them to develop a specific psycho-emotional mechanism that, along with the use of a specific acting method, would allow them to easily transform conventions in life truth (conventions like fictional and imaginary life situations, given plot and lines, a character's personality and goal etc.), unlike the old acting school when students were taught how to play theatre. Ion Cojar always said that "the art of the actor has nothing in common with theatre", a statement that became his trademark.

The professional actors who were trained via Cojar's pedagogical method tend to use in their creative processes an acting method derived from the previous one. One of his former students, Luminița Gheorghiu, won the Los Angeles Film Critics Association Award for Best Supporting Actress with her performance in The Death of Mr. Lazarescu (2005). Professor Mircea Gheorghiu, another former student of Ion Cojar, is considered to be the main continuator of his teaching method in the art of the actor. Adrian Țofei, a former student of Mircea Gheorgiu and ardent follower of Cojar's method, won the Special Jury Prize for Best Actor at the 2016 Nashville Film Festival for his performance in Be My Cat: A Film for Anne.

In parallel with the development of his method, Ion Cojar supported an educational system in which the students are not taught or modeled by the teachers, but in which the environment is that of laboratory experimentation and self-knowledge, of despecialization and deliverance from preconceptions acquired in family, school and society, an environment in which the student is able to become aware of and to use their full native creative potential that makes them unique.

In theory, Ion Cojar gathered all his research and discoveries in his book entitled "O poetică a artei actorului" ("Poetics of the actor's art").

Ion Cojar as theatre director
As a theatre director, Cojar also argued that the audiences, in order to fully empathise with what they see and hear, must not have any clue or the impression that they're witnessing a theatre show, but a genuine life event. He aimed to make theatre shows that paradoxically don't look like shows at all, where the audiences would find no elements whatsoever to indicate that they are witnessing a theatre show and not an actual life event.

He died in Bucharest in 2009, age 78, and was buried with military honors in the city's Sfânta Vineri Cemetery.

See also
 Stanislavski's system
 Method acting
 Constantin Stanislavski
 Lee Strasberg
 Sanford Meisner
 Ivana Chubbuck

References

Bibliography
 Cojar, Ion - O poetică a artei actorului (Poetics of the actor's art) - Bucharest, Unitext, 1996 / Bucharest, Paideia, 1998
 Cojar, Ion - Inițiere în arta actorului (Initiation in the actor's art), series of articles published in Teatrul (Theatre) magazine, Bucharest, 1983-1984 
 Tofei, Adrian - Ion Cojar's Acting Method

External links
 

1931 births
2009 deaths
People from Timiș County
Drama teachers
Acting theorists
Romanian educators
Romanian theatre directors
Romanian acting coaches
Romanian scientists
20th-century Romanian educators
21st-century Romanian educators
Chairpersons of the National Theatre Bucharest
Neurological disease deaths in Romania
Deaths from Parkinson's disease